Awais is an Arabic given name. 'Owais' is alternative name.

Meaning
Awais means 'gifted' or 'bestowed'. It was the name of one of Muhammad's companions Awais Qarani.

Notable people
Notable people with the name include:

Given name
 Awais Ali (born 2005), Pakistani cricketer
 Awais Khan (born 1994), Pakistani cyclist
 Awais Qadir Shah (born 1977), Pakistani politician
 Awais Qasim Khan (born 1969), Pakistani politician
 Awais Leghari (born 1971), Pakistani politician
 Awais Malik (born 1982), Qatari cricketer
 Awais Zia (born 1986), Pakistani cricketer
 Owais al-Qarani, guardian in Islam
 Owais Shah (born 1978), former English cricketer

Surname
 Mohammad Awais (born 1992), Pakistani first-class cricketer who played for Hyderabad
 Nasir Awais (born 1983), Pakistani first-class cricketer who played for Hyderabad cricket team

Arabic masculine given names